NA-124 Lahore-VIII is a newly-created constituency for the National Assembly of Pakistan. It mainly comprises 4 census charges (2, 3, 4, and areas of 16) of Model Town Tehsil.

Members of Parliament

2018-2022: NA-134 Lahore-XII

Election 2018 

General elections were held on 25 July 2018.

See also
NA-123 Lahore-VII
NA-125 Lahore-IX

References 

Lahore